Main Hoon is an entertainment talk show on TV Asia channel that hosts some of the biggest Bollywood celebrities.  It showcases some of the biggest stars in the business and is watched by a wide audience that includes people from the film fraternity.

Overview and concept
The show profiles the best of star-makers who made the stars what they are today.  These star makers include cinematographers, choreographers, makeup artists and stylists. The show tells the Masala stories of the biggest Bollywood celebrities.

References

External links
Official Site

Indian television talk shows
Television shows set in Asia
Television talk shows